Julian Calor is the name of:
Julian Calor (footballer) (born 1997), Dutch footballer
Julian Calor, Dutch music producer signed to Revealed Recordings